Greatest Hits & More is the first compilation album by Greek-Swedish recording artist Helena Paparizou, released in Greece and Cyprus by Sony Music Greece/RCA on 23 May 2011, although it became available through some retailers as early as 20 May. The album is a three disc set containing 52 tracks since the start of her solo career (since 2003), spanning five studio albums: Protereotita (2004), Iparhi Logos (2006), The Game of Love (2006), Vrisko To Logo Na Zo (2008), and Giro Apo T' Oneiro (2010). Although marketed as a greatest hits album, it contains all of Paparizou's regularly released singles, including some of their English versions, rather than a selective collection of the best performing songs, as well as several promotional singles and album tracks that have never officially been released to radios. The first disc is mostly a collection of her regularly released solo singles; the second is split into three sections: "International" containing English-language songs, "B-Sides" containing mostly album tracks (none of which are b-sides), and "Covers"; the third is split into "New Songs" featuring "Baby It's Over" and "Love Me Crazy", "Bonus Tracks" with four remixes of the former and a Greek-language version of the latter entitled "Oti Niotho Den Allazei", and finally "Duets", showcasing her work as a featured artist.

The album debuted at number two on the Greek Albums Chart and has so far spent six weeks on the chart. The album's lead single, "Baby It's Over", debuted at number one on the Billboard Greek Digital Songs Chart and eventually topped the Greek Airplay Chart for nine weeks. The album's second single is "O,ti Niotho Den Allazei" ("Love Me Crazy"). Paparizou also promoted the album with performances at the first MADWalk and The X Factor.

Background
Greatest Hits & More is Paparizou's first compilation album release. It will be a triple album, containing her hit singles as well as two new English-language tracks "Baby It's Over", "Love Me Crazy", as well as a Greek-language version of the former entitled "O,ti Niotho Den Allazi" (What i feel doesn't change). There will also be a DVD containing a collection of her music videos as well as backstage videos and a photo gallery. The release date for the album was originally announced to be in late March but it was then delayed to late April. Teasers of the lyrics of the other two songs have also been released: "There's so many dreams unlighted swirling in the sky above absent minds. Open up to be enlightened there's a miracle for everyone to find" (from "Love Me Crazy").

Paparizou began her solo career in 2003 after signing with Sony Music Entertainment Greece and has since released five studio albums in Greece and Cyprus: Protereotita (2004), the double album Iparhi Logos (2006), The Game of Love (2006), Vrisko To Logo Na Zo (2008), and Giro Apo T' Oneiro (2010). She has also released the extended plays Mambo! (2005), and Fos (2007) and has participated in four soundtracks: I Barbie Stis Dodeka Vasilopoules (2006), Mazi Sou (2007), To Fili Tis Zois, and the Swedish Arn Riket (2008). All of her Greek-language studio albums have at least one reissue. Abroad, she has released the albums My Number One (2005) and The Game of Love (2006) through her Swedish label Bonnier Amigo Music. Her chart-topping singles (either physical, radio, or digital format) include "Anapandites Kliseis", "My Number One" (also in Sweden), "Mambo!", "Gigolo", "Teardrops", "Mazi Sou", "To Fili Tis Zois", "Porta Gia Ton Ourano", "I Kardia Sou Petra", and "Baby It's Over" in Greece, as well as "Heroes" in Sweden.

Singles
"Baby It's Over" was confirmed to be the first single from the compilation. It is a dance song and was released to radios on 2 February 2011 and further released as a digital download on 18 February 2011. It debuted at number one on the Billboard Greek Digital Songs Chart, making it her fourth number-one hit on that chart and first single to top any Greek chart in three years, since "I Kardia Sou Petra". It has peaked at number 1 on the Greek Airplay Chart and is the first-highest charting domestic single. The music video was filmed in late March and is directed by Konstantinos Rigos, who had previously directed "An Isouna Agapi" for Paparizou. MAD TV has reported that "Love Me Crazy" will be the album's second single. Its Greek-language counterpart, "O,ti Niotho Den Allazei" was distributed to Greek radios on 17 May 2011.

Promotion
Paparizou performed as one of eight main acts at the first MADWalk, a charity project equivalent to the international Fashion Rocks, sponsored by Vodafone Greece, with proceeds going to ELPIDA, a charity of children with cancer. She represented fashion designer Apostolos Mitropoulos and performed a cover of En Vogue's "Free Your Mind" followed by the premiere of her new single "Baby It's Over". She then appeared as the guest act at the Greek The X Factor 3 finale on 11 February 2011, where she again performed song as well as past songs such as "An Isouna Agapi", "Tha 'Mai Allios", "Porta Gia Ton Ourano", "Girna Me Sto Htes (All Around the Dream Version)", "Fisika Mazi", and "Psahno Tin Alitheia". Both performances were done using playback.

Commercial performance
Greatest Hits & More debuted at number two on the IFPI Greece Top 75 Combined Repertoire Albums Chart, behind Lady Gaga's Born This Way, making it the best-selling domestic album of that week. It stayed there for a further three weeks until dropping down to number three in its fifth week, trading places with Sakis Rouvas' Parafora. It has so far spent thirteen weeks on the chart and, with the exception of Giro Apo T' Oneiro (2010) whose chart positions are unknown due to IFPI Greece shutting down operations at the time, it is her first album to not top the Greek sales charts.

Track listing

Charts

Notes

2011 greatest hits albums
Albums produced by Dimitris Kontopoulos
Albums produced by Don-K
Helena Paparizou albums
Greek-language albums
Sony Music Greece compilation albums